Louis Pierre, Count Montbrun (1770, Florensac, Hérault – 1812), French cavalry general, served with distinction in the cavalry arm throughout the wars of the Revolution and the Consulate, and in 1800 was appointed to command his regiment, having served therein from trooper upwards.

After serving at the Battle of Austerlitz on 2 December 1805, he was promoted to General of Brigade. He earned further distinction in Germany and Poland, and in 1808 he was sent to Spain.

Some doubt exists as to the events of the famous cavalry charge at the Battle of Somosierra (November 1808), but Montbrun's share in it was conspicuous. 

Soon afterwards he was promoted to General of division, and in 1809 his light cavalry division took no inconsiderable part in the victories of Eckmühl (April 1809) and Raab (June 1809). 

Back in Spain by 1810, he fought at the battles of Bussaco (September 1810) and Fuentes de Oñoro (May 1811), where he commanded Marshal André Masséna's cavalry reserve.

He was killed while commanding the II Cavalry Corps (Grande Armée) at the beginning of the Battle of Borodino (7 September 1812).

References
 Bowden, S. & Tarbox, C. Armies on the Danube 1809. Empire Games, 1980.
 Glover, Michael. The Peninsular War 1807–1814. Penguin, 1974.

1770 births
1812 deaths
People from Hérault
French military personnel of the French Revolutionary Wars
French commanders of the Napoleonic Wars
French military personnel killed in the Napoleonic Wars
French Republican military leaders of the French Revolutionary Wars
Grand Officiers of the Légion d'honneur
Names inscribed under the Arc de Triomphe